Hoàng Thị Tuân (born 13 May 1965) is a representative in the Twelfth Việtnamese National Assembly.

A member of the Tày ethnic minority, Tuân was born in Phì Điền village, Lục Ngạn District, Bắc Giang Province. She was accepted into the Communist Party of Việt Nam on 5 July 1997, though she has still not been made an official member.

References

Members of the National Assembly (Vietnam)
Tày people
Communist Party of Vietnam politicians
Living people
1965 births
People from Bắc Giang Province
21st-century Vietnamese women politicians
21st-century Vietnamese politicians